Blatná is a town in Strakonice District in the South Bohemian Region of the Czech Republic. It has about 6,400 inhabitants. It is known for a water castle in the centre of a pond, and a landscape garden around it. The historic town centre with the castle complex is well preserved and is protected by law as an urban monument zone.

Administrative parts
Villages of Blatenka, Čekanice, Drahenický Málkov, Hněvkov, Jindřichovice, Milčice, Řečice and Skaličany are administrative parts of Blatná.

Etymology
The name Blatná is derived from the Old Czech word blata (meaning "marshes"). It got its name from the marshlands among which it was founded.

Geography
It lies in the Blatná Uplands. The town is situated on the Lomnice River. The territory is rich in fish ponds, built here since the Middle Ages.

Climate
Blatná enjoys an inland version of temperate Oceanic climate (Cfb) with rather balanced temperatures year round. Precipitations are vastly in form of rain, totalling 691 mm. There are four pronounced seasons with notably cold, dry, and murky winter season, contrasting with much sunnier and wetter warm seasons.

History

The first settlement of the area is documented by archaeological finds up to the 4th century. In the 8th and 9th centuries, a Slavis settlement is documented. The first written mention of Blatná is from 1235, when there probably already existed a keep with a settlement. In the 14th century, Blatná became a property of the Bavors of Strakonice family, which leads to the development of the settlement.

The importance of Blatná grows especially in the 15th and at the beginning of the 16th century, when Blatná became the centre of the dominion of the family of Lords of Rosental. At that time the burghers of Blatná gained the privileges that enabled the development of handicraft production and the growth of the business – the right to organize markets and brew beer. In 1601, Blatná was promoted to a town by Emperor Rudolf II.

During the Thirty Years' War, Blatná was repeatedly looted and destroyed. The town recovered and prospered in the 18th century, when it was a property of the Serényi family. The family had part of the castle rebuilt into the Baroque style and also erected many Baroque statues in the town and its surroundings. They also completely rebuilt the church in Paštiky.

The town burned down completely in 1834; 118 houses, the town hall and the bell tower were destroyed and therefore most buildings in the town come from after that event. At that time Blatná fell to one of the poorest towns. In 1858, the town once again recovered and became a district town. The town's economy further developed after the railroad to Strakonice and Březnice was built at the end of the 19th century.

Demographics

Economy
The largest employers in Blatná are Dura Automotive CZ (manufacturer of automotive components), Leifheit (household products manufacturer) and Tesla Blatná (manufacture of electronics for cars).

Education

There are two primary schools in town.

Sights

Blatná Castle

Blatná Castle is the town's main landmark. It is built on a rock surrounded by a moat, connected with a pond. The castle is narrow, U-shaped, with a tower in front to which the palaces from various periods attach. The castle is being restored with most of the works finished. It is open for the public, together with the castle park and deer park.

Under Lords of Rosental the fortress was for the first time rebuilt in stone (the oldest parts being the tower and Rožmitálský Palace) and the surrounding marshes were changed into wide water trenches. Their long rule marks the golden age of this place. Lords of Rosental were continuously rebuilding and enlarging the castle, first with the so-called Old Palace, standing separatedly over the remnants of the Romanesque chapel. In 1523–1530, under the guidance of renowned royal builder Benedikt Rejt, a new palace in a mixed Gothic-Renaissance style was appended.

In the second half of the 17th century, the castle was owned by the house of Sternberg for a short time until it was bought by the Polish house of Rozdražovští of Rozdražov in 1579 who had a new Renaissance palace built. During their rule, the castle and town were looted. In the 18th century, the Serényi family had one wing of the castle rebuilt into the Baroque style. Since 1798, the castle has belonged to the Tyrolean house by origin of Hildprandts of Ottenhausen, except the period of communist dictatorship (1948–1989) when it was confiscated by the state. In 1850–1856 the castle received its last rebuilt, in neo-Gothic style, which gave it its contemporary looks.

Romanesque Chapel – the oldest part of the castle dating back to the 13th century, it is preserved only as a part of the wall with two arches in the western part of the courtyard.
Tower – the tower dominates the castle and it is the main entrance to it from the east. Its square shape with an overlapping half-timbered top became the symbol of the town. At the beginning of the 16th century the famous Green Chamber (Zelená světnice) was created on the first floor. The walls of this room are covered in murals depicting various religious and secular themes. The prevailing color of the paintings gave the room its name. All around the room are coats of arms of major Czech houses dominated by a large one of the house of the masters on the castle of that time, the Lords of Rosenthal.
Rožmitálský Palace – built at the same time as the tower, it connects to it from the southwest. On the first floor is the castle Chapel of the Blessed Virgin Mary, whose Gothic presbytery protrudes from the body of the palace on the south side.
Old Palace – from around the half of the 15th century is erected over the former Romanesque chapel. It's built in a late Gothic style, but its large windows already mark the coming of the Renaissance style. Originally, it stood separately to the north from the previous two parts.
Rejt's Palace – is a unique combination of a late Gothic and the upcoming Renaissance style. It was built during the rule of Zdeněk Lev of Rosenthal, an important diplomat at the court of the King Vladislaus II. It has large windows, richly decorated façade and a structured roof with wooden-tile ceilings.
Rozdražovský (or Serényi) Palace – built first in the Renaissance style and rebuilt later in the Baroque style, it closed the body of the castle by connecting the Old Palace (through a lower utility building) with the rest of the castle buildings.

Castle park

The park was created as an English landscape garden at the beginning of the 19th century by František Hildprandt. Its part close to the castle surrounds a large meadow with very old solitary oak trees. Beyond the meadow are preserved old woods with alleys, swamps, streams with footbridges over them, artificial caves, remnants after placer mining and an Empire style summer house. Its part is also a deer park. A herd of tame fallow deer freely roams the park.

Church of the Assumption of the Virgin Mary
The Church of the Assumption of the Virgin Mary lies next to the castle, at the end of the main square. It was founded in the 1290s as a two-aisled building with a long presbytery, and small adytum on the north side. It gained its present looks in 1515 when the reconstruction was finished.

The bell tower is located next to the church.

Church of Saint John the Baptist

The Baroque Church of Saint John the Baptist is located in the Blatná's part of Paštiky. It was rebuilt by renowned architect Kilian Ignaz Dientzenhofer in 1747–1752, on the order of countess Serényi. The church is a single-aisled building ended in a rectangular presbytery with richly decorated cornices in a Rococo style. The carvings inside are by Ferdinand Ublacker, the paintings are by J. V. Spitzer. Next to the church is a cemetery with a mortuary chapel under which is the family crypt of the Hildprandt family. The chapel was also built by Dientzenhofer.

School
The building of the elementary school that carries the name of J. A. Comenius was built according to the design of the local native, architect Karel Fiala, in 1902–1904.

Notable people
Karel Strakatý (1804–1868), operatic bass, first interpreter of the Czech national anthem
Kamil Běhounek (1916–1983), accordionist and composer
Zdenka Fantlová (1922–2022), actor, writer and Holocaust survivor

Twin towns – sister cities

Blatná is twinned with:
 Roggwil, Switzerland (1993)
 Sargé-lès-le-Mans, France (2004)
 Vacha, Germany (1993)
 Važec, Slovakia

References

Further reading

External links

Blatná Castle

Cities and towns in the Czech Republic
Populated places in Strakonice District
Prácheňsko